Matthews Place, also known as Ivey Hill, is a historic plantation house located near Hollister, Halifax County, North Carolina. It consists of two houses: a two-story, three bay, Georgian-style frame dwelling dated to about 1800, attached to a two-story, three bay, Greek Revival-style frame dwelling added about 1847.  The houses are set a right angles to the other.  The older house has a  single-shoulder brick chimney. The Greek Revival house features a pedimented front entrance porch with simple fluted Doric order columns.

It was listed on the National Register of Historic Places in 1974.

References

Plantation houses in North Carolina
Houses on the National Register of Historic Places in North Carolina
Georgian architecture in North Carolina
Greek Revival houses in North Carolina
Houses completed in 1800
Houses in Halifax County, North Carolina
National Register of Historic Places in Halifax County, North Carolina